Da Ros is an Italian surname. Notable people with the surname include:

Gianni Da Ros (born 1986), Italian cyclist
João Luiz da Ros (born 1982), Brazilian rugby union player
Emanuela Da Ros (born 1959), Italian writer of children's books and journalist
Scott DaRos, American animator and animation director

Italian-language surnames